Zlokuḱani is an abandoned village in the Bitola Municipality of North Macedonia. It used to be part of the former municipality of Bistrica.

Demographics
The village of Zlokuḱani, when inhabited in the past was traditionally and exclusively populated by Ghegs, a northern subgroup of Albanians that spoke the Gheg Albanian dialect.

In statistics gathered by Vasil Kanchov in 1900, the village of Zlokuḱani was inhabited by 500 Muslim Albanians.

According to the 2002 census, the village had a total of 0 inhabitants.

References

External links

Villages in Bitola Municipality
Albanian communities in North Macedonia